William Haye Weekes  (born Cambridge, 5 March 1867 – died Kenilworth  2 August 1945) was  Dean of Bloemfontein in South Africa from 1922 to 1940.

He was educated at Bristol Grammar School and Sidney Sussex College, Cambridge; and ordained in 1891. After a curacy at  St Sidwell, Ex3eter he was Chaplain to the Bishop of Bloemfontein. In 1896 he became Rector of Makefing. He was Rector at Beaconsfield from 1901 until 1912; and then of Kroonstad until 1917. He was  Archdeacon of Kimberley from 1905 to 1917; and of Bloemfontein (and Vicar of the Cathedral Parish) from 1917 to 1940. He was appointed a Chaplain of the Order of St John of Jerusalem  in 1931.

References

1867 births
People educated at Bristol Grammar School
Alumni of Sidney Sussex College, Cambridge
1945 deaths
Archdeacons of Kimberley
Archdeacons of Bloemfontein
Deans of Bloemfontein
20th-century South African Anglican priests